Erica McDermott (born April 26, 1973) is an American actress, perhaps known best for her supporting role as Cindy "Tar" Eklund, the sister of the lead character, in the David O. Russell film The Fighter (2010).

Biography
On 26 April 1973, McDermott was born in Cambridge, Massachusetts, United States, North America. While in grade school, she acted in school plays. Having trained as a registered nurse, however, she initially focused on her career in the medical profession and raising her family.

In 2008, McDermott decided to launch her acting career, starting with an appearance in The MOMologues for a school fundraiser. She continued to develop her skills by taking acting classes at the Rock Educational Cooperative and Plymouth Rock Studios, as well as appearing in various Boston stage productions.

In 2009, McDermott began her film career with a supporting role in the film short Mama Raised a Hellraiser (2010). She was soon cast, at the age of 36, as Mark Wahlberg's character's sister in the David O. Russell film The Fighter (2010).

McDermott later appeared in two more Russell films, American Hustle (2013) and Joy (2015).

In 2015, McDermott played Benedict Cumberbatch's wife in the critically acclaimed crime drama film Black Mass (2015).

Filmography

References

External links
 
 

1973 births
Actresses from Cambridge, Massachusetts
American film actresses
American television actresses
Living people
21st-century American actresses